Bremer SV is a German association football club, based in the city of Bremen, which was founded in 1906. The club play their home games at the Panzenberg Stadium and currently participate in the 4th tier Regionalliga Nord.

History
Bremer SV was formed on 1 January 1906 as BBV Sport but renamed itself to the current name in 1920.

The club played at highest level, the Gauliga Niedersachsen from 1933 to 1935 and, again, in 1939–40 and from 1942 to 1944. In post-Second World War play the club became part of the new tier one Oberliga Nord in 1947 and played there until relegated again in 1955. It returned to this league for a season in 1961–62 but had to return to the Amateurliga Bremen again. After the introduction of the Bundesliga in 1963 the club won promotion to the tier two Regionalliga Nord in 1965 but was relegated once more two seasons later. A new Oberliga Nord was established in 1974, now as the third tier and Bremer SV became a founding member but was relegated after only one season. The club made two returns to the league, from 1978 to 1981 and 1986 to 1992. Since then the club has been playing in the leagues of Bremen, unable to return to the levels above.

The club won the Bremen-Liga four years in a row between 2013–14 and 2016–17, and again in 2018–19, but each time failed to win promotion in the play-off round. They were eventually promoted to the Regionalliga Nord in 2022 after winning the Bremen-Liga again.

The club played Bayern Munich in the first round of the 2021–22 DFB-Pokal. They lost by a score of 12–0.

The club is known for its humorous self-marketing and colourful and creative support from the stands. The fans tend to be politically left-leaning.

Honours
 Bremen-Liga
 Champions: 1955–56, 1957–58, 1960–61, 1964–65, 1977–78, 1982–83, 1984–85, 1985–86, 2006–07, 2013–14, 2014–15, 2015–16, 2016–17, 2018–19, 2021-22
 Bremer Pokal
 Winners: 1979–80, 1984–85, 1985–86, 1990–91, 2013–14, 2014–15, 2015–16, 2020–21, 2021–22

References

External links
  

Football clubs in Germany
Sport in Bremen (city)
1906 establishments in Germany
Football clubs in Bremen (state)
Association football clubs established in 1906